Scott Macalister Bryce  (born January 6, 1958), sometimes credited as Scott M. Bryce, is an American film and television actor. Bryce is perhaps best known for his portrayal of Craig Montgomery on As the World Turns.

Biography
Bryce was born in New York City, the son of daytime actor Ed Bryce, who for many years played Bill Bauer on The Guiding Light.

Bryce grew up in Westport, Connecticut and attended Staples High School where he was an active member of The Staples Players student theater group. He appeared at the Palace Theater on Broadway in Caesar & Cleopatra  starring Rex Harrison  in February 1977.

Bryce, a two-time Daytime Emmy nominee, has found many ways to keep busy. The actor opened a three-camera television studio in an old vaudeville theater in Connecticut. He made numerous appearances in primetime, including Murphy Brown, on which he played the recurring role of Faith Ford's husband Will Forrest, The Facts of Life, ER, Law & Order, Reba and Sex and the City. In addition, the actor appeared as Dr. Crosby in a handful of episodes of ABC's One Life to Live in March 2006.

Bryce is perhaps best known for the role of Craig Montgomery. He joined As the World Turns in 1982 and was initially paired with Meg Ryan. He continued in the role until 1987, and then made several short term-returns over the years until he departed in 1994. The show re-hired Bryce in 2007, but it was announced in January 2008 that he had been released from the role.

In 2014, Bryce played Senator Tom Wesley in the soap opera web series Beacon Hill.

Awards and nominations for As the World Turns
Soap Opera Digest Award Nomination - Outstanding Hero: Daytime (1988)
Daytime Emmy Nomination - Outstanding Lead Actor in a Drama Series (1986, 1987)
Soap Opera Digest Award Nomination - Outstanding Young Leading Actor in a Daytime Serial (1986)

Television
The Blacklist (2021)
Blue Bloods - Dr. Garland (2014)
Homeland - Maj. Foster (2011)
30 Rock (2010)
As the World Turns - Craig Montgomery (1982–1991, 1993–1994, 2007–2008)
One Life to Live - Ed Crosby (2006–2007)
Popular - Mike McQueen (1999–2001)
Diagnosis: Murder - Tod Grimes (1997)
Law & Order - Steven Tashjian (1997–2005)
The Golden Girls - Dr Warren (1990)
Matlock - Elliot Eagleton (1993)
Sex and the City - Tim (1998)
The Facts of Life - Rick Bonner (1988)
Murphy Brown (1988–1989)
2000 Malibu Road - Scott Sterling (1992)
Law & Order: Special Victims Unit - Bill Garnet (2009), Bill Schwartz (2018)

Films
Above Freezing (1998)
Up Close & Personal - Rob Sullivan (1996)
Lethal Weapon 3 (as Scott M. Bryce) - Young Man (1992)

References

TV Guide exclusive interview regarding ATWT firing 2008-02-04

External links

American male film actors
American male soap opera actors
American male television actors
Male actors from New York City
1958 births
Living people